The Family Court (simplified Chinese: 走进走出) is a Singaporean Chinese drama which was telecasted on Singapore's free-to-air channel, MediaCorp Channel 8. It stars Tay Ping Hui, Qi Yuwu, Tong Bing Yu, Eelyn Kok, Yao Wenlong and Wayne Chua as the casts of the series. It made its debut on 1 September 2010 and ended on 1 October 2010. This drama serial consists of 23 episodes, and was screened every weekday night at 9:00 pm. The encore aired from 26 August 2011 to 27 September 2011, every weekday at 5:30pm.

Synopsis
Shen Xiping, Lin Leshan, Huang Shuya and Zhao Ning are lawyers who are poles apart from each other but together with Huang Guanying (Shuya's older brother), they form a tight group of friends. Despite being employed by two different law firms, and at times having to face off against each other in court, the five do not mix work with their personal lives. This is what keeps their friendship going. After work, the group usually gathers at Xiping's family-owned pub to talk about work and their lives. With such a strong friendship forged, a complicated love rectangle is inevitable.

Cast

Awards & Nominations
The Family Court earned a number of nominations at the 2011 Star Awards.The other dramas nominated for Best Drama Series and Best Theme Songs are Unriddle , Breakout , New Beginnings & With You

Star Awards 2011

Trivia
 Tay Ping Hui partners here with Qi Yuwu for the third time. The first time was in Love is Beautiful, 2003; the second was in C.I.D, 2006.
 Ann Kok plays a mentally unstable villain for the first time.
 The final episode ended with a cliffhanger as a second season is expected. A sequel has yet to be announced.
Qi Yuwu's first villainous role, where he plays a villain in the later part of the series.

Singapore Chinese dramas
2010 Singaporean television series debuts
2010 Singaporean television series endings
Channel 8 (Singapore) original programming